Dicliptera sericea is a plant native of Cerrado vegetation of Brazil. This plant is cited in Flora Brasiliensis by Carl Friedrich Philipp von Martius.

External links 

  Flora Brasiliensis: Dicliptera sericea

Acanthaceae
Flora of Brazil
Flora of the Cerrado